The Beer Can House is a folk art house in Rice Military, Houston, Texas, covered with beer cans, bottles, and other beer paraphernalia.

Houstonian John Milkovisch worked through the late 1960s to transform his Houston home at 222 Malone Street into the Beer Can House. The Beer Can House is now one of Houston's most recognizable folk art icons. It is covered with flattened beer cans, bottle caps, bottles, and other beer ephemera. The house is estimated to include over 50,000 beer cans.

Milkovisch started his project in 1968 inlaying thousands of marbles, rocks, brass figures and metal pieces in concrete blocks and redwood, all of which were used to make patios, fences, flower boxes, and an array of other items. The result was a yard with no grass, as the entire front and back yards were  covered with cement. When asked why he did it, John simply answered, "I got sick of mowing the grass."

Today, the Beer Can House is owned and operated by The Orange Show Center for Visionary Art,  a non-profit organization founded in 1980 to preserve and present works of extraordinary imagination and provide people the opportunity to express personal artistic vision.

In March 2004, John Milkovisch was named Man of the Week on Spike TV. In 2010 comedy news site Cracked.com said, "if there's ever a vote on who the awesomest guy ever was, John Milkovisch ought to at least be on the ballot."

See also

 List of public art in Houston
Tin can wall

References

External links
Beer Can House official site

American folk art
Tourist attractions in Houston
Roadside attractions in Texas
Outdoor sculptures in Houston
Houses in Houston